Hotel Lux is a 2011 German period film directed by Leander Haußmann. The tragicomedy begins in Nazi Germany and moves to the Soviet Union. Featuring the main character Hans Zeisig, an apolitical comedian, the picture involves him with numerous historical facts and figures of this era.

Plot
In 1933, as Adolf Hitler and the Nazis come to power in Germany, actor and comedian Hans Zeisig (Michael Herbig) and his partner, Siggi Meyer (Jürgen Vogel), have a successful comedy act at a Berlin cabaret doing impersonations of Joseph Stalin and Adolf Hitler. Meyer is politically active in the Communist Party and through him, Zeisig meets the attractive Dutch communist Frida (Thekla Reuten). Zeisig is apolitical; he's dreaming about a career in Hollywood. He finds the growing political tension an unpleasant nuisance, but Meyer is endangered by the Nazis' power grab. He arrives one day at the theater with a black eye from an attack and says he is going to go underground. Another performer, a Nazi supporter who caricatures a Jewish man, makes a wisecrack about Meyer's black eye. They get into a backstage brawl, fully made up and in costume—the Nazi as a Jew and the Communist as Hitler. The fight careens its way from the dressing room to the stage, with "Hitler" on top of the "Jew". The audience, larded with uniformed Nazis, assumes it to be part of the show and cheers.

The situation continues to deteriorate in Germany. Audiences grow dour, and the theater management has to comply with the prevailing Gleichschaltung. Kristallnacht occurs. Zeisig refuses to perform the defamatory act of the stereotyped Jew. When he is told that it won't do anybody harm, Zeisig states, "It will harm me!" He goes onstage clad as Hitler and satirizes him, knowing he will have to flee. Zeisig learns Meyer has been arrested and deported to Oranienburg concentration camp. Equipped with a forged passport, a fake beard and an assumed name, Zeisig leaves Germany and eventually enters the Soviet Union. His goal is still Hollywood. In Moscow, he arrives at the Hotel Lux (this was a historic hotel in Moscow, where many exiled German communists sought shelter during the Nazi era).

Zeisig encounters Frida, who under a different name, has an important position in the exiled German Communist Party. He also encounters numerous historical figures, such as Walter Ulbricht, Herbert Wehner and others, who later became important political figures in East Germany. The apolitical Zeisig has landed in a hotbed of political intrigue; all important conversations are held with the water running to shield them from the ubiquitous bugs. Zeisig wonders if he is in more danger at the Moscow hotel than he was in Nazi Germany. Taken for a ride to an unknown location, he learns his assumed identity is that of Hitler's astrological advisor, a person of great interest to Stalin. Zeisig is taken to Stalin in the only available safe place, the bathroom. Stalin motions for him to come forward, but remain silent. Stalin turns the water on and only then begins to speak. With Stalin's Great Purge underway, Zeisig realizes that his life depends on his ability to placate the leader. Zeisig narrowly escapes one danger after another, revives his friendship with Meyer, and gains Frida's support.

Background
The film's director, Leander Haußmann, grew up under communism in Quedlinburg, Saxony-Anhalt. The film is dedicated to the director's late father, Ezard Haußmann.

Hotel Lux was in pre-production more than four years; the script was worked on by two screenwriters. Herbig, a popular comedian, actor, and director known as a perfectionist, required more changes before he would sign on. He found the first versions of the script to be "too dramatic, too brutal," but joined the production after a lighter tone was reached. Herbig said he could finally relate to the character, a clueless comedian.

At the Rome Film Festival 2011, German distributor Bavaria Film sold the film to Italian distributor Archibald Films.

Reception

Accolades
The official German film evaluation institution Deutsche Film- und Medienbewertung rated Hotel Lux as "especially valuable" (besonders wertvoll), the highest rating possible.

Historical references
The production company has released teaching materials related to the film.

Notable figures portrayed or mentioned (selection)

Other historical references (selection)

See also 
 You Nazty Spy!
 I'll Never Heil Again
 The Great Dictator (1940)
 To Be or Not to Be (1942)
 Der Fuehrer's Face
 La Grande Vadrouille
 To Be or Not to Be (remake, 1983)
 Life Is Beautiful (1997)

References

External links
 
  
 Hotel Lux at the Film Festival of Rome in 2011
 Official Trailer with English subtitles
 Review Screen Daily (November 3, 2011). Retrieved November 10, 2011 

2011 films
2010s historical comedy-drama films
German historical comedy-drama films
2010s German-language films
Films about actors
Films set in the 1930s
Films set in Moscow
Films set in the Soviet Union
Films about Joseph Stalin
Films shot in Cologne
Films critical of communism
Cultural depictions of Adolf Hitler
Cultural depictions of Joseph Stalin
Cultural depictions of Leon Trotsky
2010s German films